Lanigan (pop. 1300) is a town in south-central Saskatchewan, Canada, at the  intersection of TransCanada Yellowhead Highway 16 and Highway 20, approximately 117 km east of Saskatoon and 170 km north of Regina.

Lanigan is surrounded by the RM of Usborne No. 310 and is about 2 kilometres west of Lanigan Creek and about 10 km west of Jansen Lake. Quill Lakes are about 34 km to the east along the Yellowhead Highway.

Sports and recreation
The town of Lanigan has a wide variety of sporting activities and facilities, including a nine-hole grass green golf course, a 25-metre outdoor heated swimming pool, a curling rink with four sheets of ice, ball diamonds, camping, and tennis courts. At the heart of Lanigan is the Lanigan Recreation Complex that features a skating rink, a fully equipped kitchen, a hall, and meeting room facilities. The complex is home to the Lanigan Pirates of the Long Lake Hockey League.

Demographics 

Notable people
The Age of Electric, an alternative rock band
Cori Bartel, Athlete (curling)
Bobby Baun, who is noted for scoring overtime winner for Toronto in a 1964 playoff game against Detroit, while playing with a fractured ankle
Sheldon Brookbank, NHL player and member of 2013 Stanley Cup champion Chicago Blackhawks
Wade Brookbank, NHL player with the Tampa Bay Lightning
Brian Propp, former NHL player with the Philadelphia Flyers, Boston Bruins, Minnesota North Stars and Hartford Whalers

See also
List of towns in Saskatchewan
List of communities in Saskatchewan

References

External links

Towns in Saskatchewan
Usborne No. 310, Saskatchewan
Division No. 11, Saskatchewan